The 1998–99 Croatian Football Cup was the eighth edition of Croatia's football knockout competition. Croatia Zagreb were the defending champions, and it was won by Osijek. This was the first season when a preliminary round was played, with top level clubs entering the competition in the first round proper.

Calendar

Preliminary round

First round

Second round

Quarter-finals

|}

Semi-finals

First legs

Second legs

Osijek won 1–0 on aggregate.

3–3 on aggregate. Cibalia won 6–5 in penalty shootout.

Final

See also
1998–99 Croatian First Football League
1998–99 Croatian Second Football League

External links
Official website 
1998–99 in Croatian football at Rec.Sport.Soccer Statistics Foundation
Croatian Cup Finals at Rec.Sport.Soccer Statistics Foundation

Croatian Football Cup seasons
Croatian Cup, 1998-99
Croatian Cup, 1998-99